Grace Erin Cutler (born February 18, 1997) is an American professional soccer player who plays as a forward for WE League club Omiya Ardija Ventus.

Club career 
Houston Dash drafted Cutler with the 22nd pick in the 2019 NWSL College Draft. She signed with Washington Spirit and the Dash in 2019 but did not appear in a game.

Cutler made her WE League debut on September 26, 2021. She became the first non-Japanese player to score in league history on October 2, 2021.

References

External links 
 Santa Clara profile
 West Virginia profile
 
 

1997 births
Living people
American women's soccer players
Women's association football forwards
Houston Dash draft picks
Omiya Ardija Ventus players
WE League players
American expatriate women's soccer players
Expatriate women's footballers in Italy
American expatriate sportspeople in Italy
Expatriate women's footballers in Japan
American expatriate sportspeople in Japan
Santa Clara Broncos women's soccer players
West Virginia Mountaineers women's soccer players